Offutt (originally known as Ward City) is an unincorporated community and coal town in Johnson County, Kentucky, United States. The community became known as Offutt during the early 1900s after James Offutt, the president of Rockcastle Lumber Company. The community's ZIP Code is 41237.

Offutt is located at an elevation of 646 feet.

References

Unincorporated communities in Johnson County, Kentucky
Unincorporated communities in Kentucky
Coal towns in Kentucky